The 1986 Kansas gubernatorial election was held on November 4, 1986. Incumbent Democratic Governor John W. Carlin did not run for re-election. Republican nominee Mike Hayden, then Speaker of the Kansas House of Representatives, beat the Democratic nominee Thomas Docking, who was then the incumbent  Lieutenant Governor of Kansas. This was the last gubernatorial election in Kansas in which the winner was of the same party as the incumbent president until Laura Kelly's victory in 2022.

Candidates

Democratic 
 Thomas Docking, incumbent Lieutenant Governor of Kansas

Republican 
 Mike Hayden, Speaker of the Kansas House of Representatives
 Jack Brier, Secretary of State of Kansas

General Election

Results

References 

1986
Kansas
Gubernatorial